Harvardiana is a march song of Harvard University written by Raymond G. Williams (1887–1981) and Sanger B. Steel (1889–1927), both members of the Harvard class of 1911. 

The song uses the name "Eli" to refer to athletic rival Yale.  In recent years it has become the tradition for women to shout "Radcliffe!" between the repetitions of "Harvard!" in the chorus of the song.

See also
Fight Fiercely, Harvard
Ten Thousand Men of Harvard

External links
Video of Harvardiana song
audio and lyrics to Harvard fight songs, Harvard University Band

Harvard University
Ivy League fight songs